AFG3 ATPase family gene 3-like 2 (S. cerevisiae) is a protein that in humans is encoded by the AFG3L2 gene.

This gene encodes a protein localized in mitochondria and closely related to paraplegin. The paraplegin gene is responsible for an autosomal recessive form of hereditary spastic paraplegia. This gene is a candidate gene for other hereditary spastic paraplegias or neurodegenerative disorders  as well as spastic ataxia-neuropathy syndrome.

References

External links

Further reading